Tadeusz Sławecki (born 27 August 1957 in Czemierniki) is a Polish politician. He was elected to the Sejm on 25 September 2005, getting 6879 votes in 7 Chełm district as a candidate from the Polish People's Party list.

He was also a member of Sejm 1993-1997.

See also
Members of Polish Sejm 2005-2007

External links
Tadeusz Sławecki - parliamentary page - includes declarations of interest, voting record, and transcripts of speeches.

Members of the Polish Sejm 2005–2007
Members of the Polish Sejm 1993–1997
Polish People's Party politicians
1957 births
Living people
Members of the Polish Sejm 2007–2011